Ridicule is a 1996 French period drama film directed by Patrice Leconte and starring Charles Berling, Jean Rochefort, Fanny Ardant and Judith Godrèche. Set in the 18th century at the decadent court of Versailles, where social status can rise and fall based on one's ability to mete out witty insults and avoid ridicule oneself, the film's plot examines the social injustices of late 18th-century France, in showing the corruption and callousness of the aristocrats.

Plot 

In the Dombes, a swampy region north of Lyon, Baron Grégoire Ponceludon de Malavoy is a minor aristocrat and engineer. He is one of the few aristocrats who care about the plight of the peasants. Horrified by the sickness and death caused by the mosquitoes that infest the swamps, he hopes to drain them; he goes to Versailles in the hope of obtaining the backing of King Louis XVI. Just before reaching Versailles, Ponceludon is robbed and beaten. He is found by the Marquis de Bellegarde, a minor noble and physician. As Ponceludon recuperates at the marquis' house, Bellegarde takes him under his wing, teaching him about wit (l'esprit), the primary way to make one's way at court. At first, Ponceludon's provincial background makes him a target at parties and gatherings, even though he proves himself a formidable adversary in verbal sparring.

At one such party, he catches L'abbé de Vilecourt cheating at a game of wits, with the help of his lover, Madame de Blayac, the beautiful and rich recent widow of Monsieur de Blayac, who was to have been Ponceludon's sponsor at court. Blayac repays his generosity in not exposing them by arranging for the certification of his lineage—thereby allowing his suit to proceed. Despite his success, Ponceludon begins to see that the court at Versailles is corrupt and hollow.

The only exception is Mathilde de Bellegarde, the doctor's daughter. She has agreed to marry Monsieur de Montaliéri, a rich, old aristocrat whose wife is dying. Her motivation is twofold: to support her science experiments and to help pay off her father's debts. Ponceludon begins to help her with her experiments. Montaliéri observes their growing attraction to each other. Later, Montaliéri tells Ponceludon that he should wait, as he is not likely to live very long, and Mathilde would be a rich widow. Even after Mathilde admits that she dreads her upcoming marriage, Ponceludon does not want her to end up the wife of a poor man.

One day, a deaf-mute named Paul runs through the woods wearing Mathilde’s diving suit and frightens Madame de Blayac. Blayac makes Bellegarde send him away. Bellegarde sends the boy to the Abbé de l'Épée, a pioneering educator of the deaf.  Mathilde visits Madame de Blayac and unsuccessfully pleads for Paul. Madame de Blayac senses a rival for Ponceludon. Meanwhile Vilecourt is concerned that Ponceludon is becoming too successful, so Madame de Blayac promises to bring him down. Madame de Blayac traps Ponceludon at a dinner party (with her accomplice Montaliéri) where one too many guests has been invited. A contest of wit is used to settle who must make a humiliating departure. Distracted by Blayac, Ponceludon loses, and is convinced that his disgrace will force him to leave the court. However, he is reminded of why he set out in the first place when a village child dies from drinking contaminated water. During this time, Mathilde appears at court, breaking the terms of her engagement contract.

Vilecourt finally obtains an audience with the King, but blunders by accidentally blaspheming against God in an attempt to be witty, and Blayac turns her attention back to Ponceludon, convincing him to return to Versailles. He sleeps with her in exchange for her assistance; she arranges a meeting with the King. She maliciously has Bellegarde attend her in his capacity as physician when Ponceludon is still with her, ensuring that Mathilde learns of their relationship.

During a presentation at court of the Abbé de l'Épée's work with deaf people and development of sign language, the nobles ridicule the deaf mercilessly. However, some nobles change their minds when the deaf demonstrate their own form of wit: sign language puns. In response, de Bellegarde stands and asks how to sign "bravo," leading Ponceludon to rise and clap to show his support. Mathilde is touched, and they soon make up.

Ponceludon joins the King's entourage and, after showing off his engineering prowess by proposing an improvement to a cannon, secures a private meeting with the King to discuss his project. The embarrassed cannoneer then insults Ponceludon, forcing him into demanding a duel. Madame de Blayac fails to persuade him to avoid the duel. He kills the cannoneer and learns that the King cannot meet with someone who has killed one of his officers right after his death, although he is assured that it was right to uphold his honour.

Madame de Blayac is furious when she learns that Ponceludon has left her for Mathilde and plots her revenge. Ponceludon is invited to a costume ball "only for wits." Upon arriving at the ball with Mathilde, he is manoeuvered into dancing with Blayac and is tripped. His spectacular fall earns him the derisive nickname "Marquis des Antipodes" by Milletail. Ponceludon tears off his mask and condemns their decadence. He tells them that they class themselves with Voltaire because of their wit, but they have none of Voltaire's compassion. He vows to drain the swamp by himself and leaves the court with Mathilde. Madame de Blayac removes her mask and stands silently crying.

In 1794 in Dover, England, Bellegarde has fled from the French Revolution. On-screen text states that Grégoire and Mathilde Ponceludon successfully drained the Dombes and live in revolutionary France.

Cast 
 Charles Berling as Le Baron Grégoire Ponceludon de Malavoy
 Jean Rochefort as Le Marquis de Bellegarde
 Fanny Ardant as Madame de Blayac
 Judith Godrèche as Mathilde de Bellegarde
 Bernard Giraudeau as L'abbé de Vilecourt
 Bernard Dhéran as Monsieur de Montaliéri
 Carlo Brandt as Le Chevalier de Milletail
 Jacques Mathou as Abbé de l'Epée
 Urbain Cancelier as Louis XVI
 Albert Delpy as Baron de Guéret
 Bruno Zanardi as Paul
 Marie Pillet as Charlotte

Awards

Won 
 César Award for Best Film
 César Award for Best Director – Patrice Leconte
 César Award for Best Costume Design – Christian Gasc
 César Award for Best Art Direction – Ivan Maussion
 BAFTA Award for Best Film not in the English Language
 David di Donatello for Best Foreign Film

Nominations 
 César Award for Best Actor – Charles Berling
 César Award for Best Actor in a Supporting Role – Bernard Giraudeau, Jean Rochefort
 César Award for Best Original Screenplay – Remi Waterhouse
 César Award for Best Music – Antoine Duhamel
 César Award for Best Cinematography – Thierry Arbogast
 César Award for Best Sound – Dominique Hennequin, Jean Goudier
 Academy Award for Best Foreign Language Film
 Cannes Film Festival – Palme d'Or

See also
 List of submissions to the 69th Academy Awards for Best Foreign Language Film
 List of French submissions for the Academy Award for Best Foreign Language Film
 List of films featuring the deaf and hard of hearing

References

External links 

 
 Ridicule at Virtual History

1996 films
1990s French-language films
1996 drama films
Films directed by Patrice Leconte
French Revolution films
Films set in the 1780s
Films set in 1794
Films set in France
Best Foreign Language Film BAFTA Award winners
Best Film César Award winners
Best Film Lumières Award winners
Films whose director won the Best Director César Award
Films featuring a Best Actress Lumières Award-winning performance
Films featuring a Best Actor Lumières Award-winning performance
Cultural depictions of Louis XVI
1990s historical drama films
French historical drama films
1990s French films